Shay-Oren Smadja (born June 20, 1970) is a former Israeli judoka and a judo coach. Smadja won the Olympic bronze medal in judo at the 1992 Summer Olympics, making him the first Israeli man to win an Olympic medal, and the second Israeli overall after Yael Arad won silver in judo the day before.

Career
Smadja was born in Ofakim, Israel, to a family of Sephardic Jewish (Tunisian-Jewish) descent. He won the Olympic bronze medal in judo at the 1992 Summer Olympics the under 71 category. In 1995, he won a silver medal at the 1995 World Judo Championships. The next year, he could not repeat his Olympic success at the 1996 Summer Olympics.

He was nominated the national coach of the Israeli men's judo team in 2010.

He coaches Israeli judokas Or Sasson, winner of the bronze medal in the 2016 summer olympics (men 100kg+), and Sagi Muki, who won the gold medal at the 2015 European Games in judo in the under 73 category and the gold medal at the 2019 World Judo Championships in Tokyo in the under 81 category. 

Smadja is the first Israeli to win an Olympic medal both as an athlete and as a coach.

Achievements

See also
List of select Jewish judokas

References

External links

 
 
 
 
 

1970 births
Living people
Israeli male judoka
Judoka trainers
Olympic judoka of Israel
Olympic medalists in judo
Olympic bronze medalists for Israel
Judoka at the 1992 Summer Olympics
Judoka at the 1996 Summer Olympics
Medalists at the 1992 Summer Olympics
Israeli Mizrahi Jews
Israeli people of Tunisian-Jewish descent
People from Ofakim
Israeli Sephardi Jews